Salensis is Latin for "of the island of Sal", Cape Verde. It may refer to several species found on the island and in the surrounding waters:

Manzonia salensis, a minute sea snail species
Oochoristica salensis, a tapeworm species
Parablennius salensis, a blenny species

Synonyms
Mabuia salensis, synonym of Chioninia spinalis